This is a list of released recordings by English singer, songwriter Steve Adey. To date, Adey has released two studio albums and various EPs and singles.

Studio albums

EPs

Singles

Videos

Other releases

External links
Official website

References
 discography, AllMusic

Adey, Steve